Washington Township is one of the twenty-two townships of Tuscarawas County, Ohio, United States.  The 2000 census found 762 people in the township.

Geography
Located in the southern part of the county, it borders the following townships:
Clay Township - north
Rush Township - northeast corner
Perry Township - east
Monroe Township, Guernsey County - south
Wheeling Township, Guernsey County - southwest corner
Oxford Township - west
Salem Township - northwest

No municipalities are located in Washington Township.

Name and history
It is one of forty-three Washington Townships statewide.

Washington Township was organized in 1827.

Government
The township is governed by a three-member board of trustees, who are elected in November of odd-numbered years to a four-year term beginning on the following January 1. Two are elected in the year after the presidential election and one is elected in the year before it. There is also an elected township fiscal officer, who serves a four-year term beginning on April 1 of the year after the election, which is held in November of the year before the presidential election. Vacancies in the fiscal officership or on the board of trustees are filled by the remaining trustees.  The current trustees are Loren Berger, William Edwards, and Micah Hagan, and the fiscal officer is Karla Jean Bierbower.

References

External links
County website

Townships in Tuscarawas County, Ohio
Townships in Ohio